Acid Reign are an English thrash metal band, originally active from 1985 to 1991. The band rebooted in 2015 with just H remaining from the original line up. Along with Onslaught, Sabbat and Xentrix, Acid Reign are considered to be one of the "big four" of British thrash metal. To date, they have released three studio albums: The Fear (1989), Obnoxious (1990) and The Age of Entitlement (2019).

History

Initial career (1985–1991) 
Acid Reign were formed by drummer and keyboardist Mark Ramsey Wharton , bassist Ian Gangwer (originally Peter Warriner), singer Howard "H" Smith , and future Cathedral member, guitarist Gary "Gaz" Jennings.

In 1987, the band released the Moshkinstein demo. On the strength of this recording, they were picked up by British thrash metal label Under One Flag (a subsidiary of Music for Nations) in 1988 who released the Moshkinstein EP. Following this release, Jennings was replaced by another future Cathedral member, Adam Lehan (formerly of Lord Crucifier), and the band gained support slots opening for such acts as Flotsam and Jetsam and Death Angel.  Acid Reign struck up a friendship with label mates Nuclear Assault and Exodus, and toured the UK and Europe as support to the Survive and Fabulous Disaster tours.

The band released their debut album, The Fear, in 1989.  In support of the album, Acid Reign toured with Nuclear Assault again in 1989 across Europe with Dark Angel and Candlemass, with bassist Ian "Mac" MacDonald replacing Gangwer. Their second album, Obnoxious, arrived in 1990 to generally poor reviews.

Post-split (1991–2014) 
Acid Reign broke up in 1991 after parting ways with Music For Nations. They played their final show at the London Marquee Club.

In January 2014, H started the world's only comedy/heavy metal podcast called "Talking Bollocks" for the British metal website All About the Rock.

On 30 November 2014, Acid Reign frontman H told All About the Rock:

Reboot (2015–present) 
On 5 May 2015, Acid Reign announced on their Facebook page that they had reformed. Frontman Howard "H" Smith, who is the only original member of Acid Reign involved in the reboot, commented, "Finally the rebooted line up is complete, it's taken nearly two years but I can honestly say it's been worth the wait. Typically we're doing things differently to everyone else as where they reformed (and believe me we tried) we are now rebooting. Everyone in the band has Acid Reign in their DNA, some of the guys knew the band back in the day and some didn't but everyone is on the same page and we can't wait to get out there and show the world how much it has been missing us." Two months later, Acid Reign released their first song in 25 years, "Plan of the Damned", via streaming platforms.

On 27 September 2019 the band released their first full-length studio album in 29 years, engineered, produced and mixed by Jayce Lewis at Northstone Studios, the long awaited album titled The Age of Entitlement was released via Dissonance Productions to worldwide critical and fan acclaim.

In May 2021, Acid Reign confirmed on their Facebook page that original bassist Ian Gangwer had died. No cause of death was given at the time.

On March 25, 2022, the band announced via their Facebook page that they had parted company with guitarist Paul Chanter.

Acid Reign are currently working on new material for their fourth full-length studio album.

Discography

Studio albums 
The Fear (1989) (UK Indie No. 10)
Obnoxious (1990)
The Age of Entitlement (2019)

Other releases 
The Worst of Acid Reign (compilation, 1991)
The Apple Core Archives (box set, 2014)

EPs 
Moshkinstein (1988)
Humanoia (1989)

Singles 
"Hanging on the Telephone" (1989)
"Plan of the Damned" (2015)
"The Man Who Became Himself" (2017)

Band members

Current members 
Howard "H" Smith – vocals (1985–1991, 2014–present)
Cooky – guitar (2015–present)
Matt Smith – guitar (2022–present)
Pete Dee – bass (2015–present)
Marc Jackson – drums (2014–present)

Former members 
Mark Ramsey Wharton – drums, keyboards (1985–1991)
Garry Jennings – guitar (1985–1988)
Ian Gangwer – bass (1985–1989) (d. 2021)
Kevin "Kev" Papworth – guitar (1987–1991)
Adam Lehan – guitar (1989–1990)
Ian "Mac" MacDonald – bass (1989–1991)
Paul Chanter – guitar (2015–2022)

Timeline

References 

Musical groups established in 1985
Musical groups disestablished in 1991
Political music groups
English thrash metal musical groups
Musical groups from Harrogate
1985 establishments in England
Musical groups reestablished in 2015